Juliana Velasquez Tonasse (born October 19, 1986) is a Brazilian professional mixed martial artist currently competing in the flyweight division of Bellator MMA, where she is the former Bellator Women's Flyweight World Champion. As of April 26, 2022, she is #3 in the Bellator Women's pound-for-pound Rankings and #1 in the Bellator Women's Flyweight Rankings.

Background
Juliana Velasquez's father introduced her to the judo mats when she was only four years old. The young carioca entered high-level competition 11 years later, capturing a few medals in the South American judo circuit. After failing to win a spot on the Brazilian Olympic Judo team, at the age of 28, she decided to try her luck in the mixed martial arts world.

In 2013, she gained attention in Brazil for her part played in a polemic story about a fight between herself and male fighter Emerson Falcão, promoted by Shooto Brazil. After receiving a ton of criticism from the combat sports community for the promotion of a fight between a man and a woman, the promotion revealed the real reason for the event was to raise awareness and bring attention to a campaign about violence against women and that the bout wasn't actually going to take place.

Mixed martial arts career

Early career
Making her debut in 2014, Velasquez won her amateur debut via second-round submission, later that year, kicking off her professional career with a decision victory in a Rio de Janeiro regional promotion. She won her next 4 fights, collecting a 5–0 record, in the process also winning the 1RC Vacant Bantamweight Championship and defending it once. She was eventually offered a multi fight contract with Bellator MMA.

Bellator MMA

Juliana made her Bellator debut against Na Liang at Bellator 189 on December 1, 2017. She won the fight via second round armbar.

Juliana faced Rebecca Ruth at Bellator 197 on April 13, 2018. She won the fight via front kick to the body in the third round.

In her third fight for the promotion, Velasquez faced Alejandra Lara at Bellator 212 on December 14, 2018. She won the fight via split decision.

Juliana faced Kristina Williams at Bellator 224 on July 12, 2019. She won the fight via TKO in the second round.

Juliana faced Bruna Ellen at Bellator 236 on December 21, 2019. She won the fight via unanimous decision.

Bellator Women's Flyweight World Champion
Juliana faced undefeated flyweight champ, Ilima-Lei Macfarlane, on December 10, 2020 at Bellator 254. She won the fight and the Bellator Women's Flyweight World Championship via unanimous decision.

Juliana made her first title defense against Denise Kielholtz on July 16, 2021 at Bellator 262. She won the bout by split decision.

Velasquez attempted to defend her title against Liz Carmouche on April 22, 2022 at Bellator 278. She lost the bout and the title via elbows from crucifix at the end of the fourth round. Following the bout, Velasquez's team appealed the result on the grounds of refereeing error made by Mike Beltran, but the appeal was denied by the Hawaii State Boxing Commission.

In a title rematch, Velasquez faced Liz Carmouche again on December 9, 2022 at Bellator 289. She lost the fight via an armbar submission in the second round.

Championships and accomplishments

Mixed martial arts
Bellator MMA
Bellator Women's Flyweight World Championship (One time)  
One successful title defense
1º Round Combat
1RC Bantamweight Championship (One time)
One successful title defense

Mixed martial arts record

|-
|Loss
|align=center|12–2
|Liz Carmouche
|Submission (armbar)
|Bellator 289
|
|align=center|2
|align=center|4:24
|Uncasville, Connecticut, United States
|
|-
|Loss
|align=center|12–1
|Liz Carmouche
|TKO (elbows)
|Bellator 278
|
|align=center|4
|align=center|4:47
|Honolulu, Hawaii, United States
|
|-
|Win
|align=center|12–0
|Denise Kielholtz
|Decision (split)
|Bellator 262
|
|align=center|5
|align=center|5:00
|Uncasville, Connecticut, United States
|
|-
|Win
|align=center|11–0
|Ilima-Lei Macfarlane
|Decision (unanimous)
|Bellator 254
|
|align=center|5
|align=center|5:00
|Uncasville, Connecticut, United States
|
|-
|Win 
|align=center| 10–0
|Bruna Ellen
|Decision (unanimous)
|Bellator 236
|
|align=center|3
|align=center|5:00
|Honolulu, Hawaii, United States
|
|-
| Win
|align=center| 9–0
|Kristina Williams
| TKO (punches)
|Bellator 224
|
|align=center|2
|align=center|4:03
|Thackerville, Oklahoma, United States
|
|-
| Win
| align=center| 8–0
| Alejandra Lara
|Decision (split)
|Bellator 212
|
|align=center|3
|align=center|5:00
|Honolulu, Hawaii, United States 
|
|-
| Win
| align=center| 7–0
| Rebecca Ruth
| KO (body kick)
|Bellator 197
|
|align=center|3
|align=center|0:19
|St. Charles, Missouri, United States
|
|-
| Win
| align=center| 6–0
| Na Liang
| Submission (armbar) 
| Bellator 189
| 
| align=center| 2
| align=center| 0:32
| Thackerville, Oklahoma, United States
|
|-
| Win
| align=center| 5–0
| Taynna Taygma
| Decision (unanimous)
| IKombat 1
|  
| align=center|3
| align=center|5:00
| Guarulhos, Brazil
|
|-
| Win
| align=center| 4–0
| Elaine Albuquerque
| KO (punches)
| 1° Round Combat 2
|  	
| align=center| 1
| align=center| 3:55
| Natal, Brazil
|
|-
| Win
| align=center| 3–0
| Rosy Duarte
| TKO (doctor stoppage)
|1° Round Combat
|  
| align=center| 5
| align=center| 4:07
| Fortaleza, Brazil
|
|-
| Win
| align=center| 2–0
|Talita Bernardo
|Decision (unanimous)
|Face to Face 11
|
|align=center| 3
|align=center| 5:00
|Rio de Janeiro, Brazil
|
|-
| Win
| align=center| 1–0
| Priscila de Souza
| Decision (unanimous)
| Team Nogueira MMA Fight Live 4
|  
| align=center| 3
| align=center| 5:00
| Rio de Janeiro, Brazil
|
|-

|-
|Win
|align=center|1–0
|Lucelia Souza
|Submission (rear-naked choke)
|Talent Draft 1: São Paulo
|
|align=center|2
|align=center|1:57
|São Paulo, Brazil
|
|-

See also
 List of current Bellator fighters
 List of current mixed martial arts champions
 List of Bellator MMA champions
 List of female mixed martial artists

References

External links
 
 

1986 births
Living people
Brazilian female judoka
Brazilian female mixed martial artists
Flyweight mixed martial artists
Mixed martial artists utilizing judo
Bellator female fighters
Bellator MMA champions
Sportspeople from Rio de Janeiro (city)
20th-century Brazilian women
21st-century Brazilian women